The Hunt (Portuguese: A Caça) is a 1963 short Portuguese film directed by Manoel de Oliveira. The film is a grim, surrealistic short narrative film that contrasted with the positive tones of Oliveira's previous film. Due to censorship issues, Oliveira was forced to add a "happy ending" to the initial release of the film and was unable to restore his original ending until 1988. Because of this film and anti- Salazar regime comments Oliveira made after a screening of his previous film O Acto de Primavera, he was arrested by the PIDE in 1963. He spent 10 days in jail and was interrogated until finally being released with the help of his friend Manuel Meneres.

Cast
 António Rodrigues Sousa as José  
 João Rocha Almeida as Roberto  
 Albino Freitas as Sapateiro, shoe-maker  
 Manuel De Sa as Maneta, one-handed man

References

External links 
 

1963 films
Films directed by Manoel de Oliveira
1960s Portuguese-language films
Portuguese short films
1963 short films